Suturoglypta is a genus of sea snails, marine gastropod mollusks in the family Columbellidae, the dove snails.

Species
Species within the genus Suturoglypta include:
 Suturoglypta albella (C. B. Adams, 1850)
 Suturoglypta annosa Espinosa & Ortea, 2018
 Suturoglypta blignautae Kilburn, 1998
 Suturoglypta buysi Lussi, 2009
 Suturoglypta cachoi Espinosa & Ortea, 2018
 Suturoglypta dictynna Espinosa & Ortea, 2018
 Suturoglypta dione Espinosa & Ortea, 2018
 Suturoglypta esbelta Espinosa & Ortea, 2018
 Suturoglypta evanescens Pelorce, 2017
 Suturoglypta idaniae Espinosa & Ortea, 2018
 Suturoglypta iontha (Ravenel, 1861)
 Suturoglypta iris Espinosa & Ortea, 2018
 Suturoglypta jagua Espinosa & Ortea, 2018
 Suturoglypta kevini Segers, Swinnen & De Prins, 2009
 Suturoglypta leali Espinosa & Ortea, 2018
 Suturoglypta luna Espinosa & Ortea, 2018
 Suturoglypta maisiana Espinosa & Ortea, 2018
 Suturoglypta mulata Espinosa & Ortea, 2018
 Suturoglypta occidualis Espinosa & Ortea, 2013
 Suturoglypta orboniana Espinosa & Ortea, 2018
 Suturoglypta pretrii (Duclos, 1846)
 Suturoglypta regina Espinosa & Ortea, 2018
 Suturoglypta translucida Pelorce, 2020
 Suturoglypta venusta Espinosa & Ortea, 2018
Species brought into synonymy
 Suturoglypta hotessieriana (d'Orbigny, 1842): synonym of Costoanachis hotessieriana (d'Orbigny, 1842)
 Suturoglypta procera Simone & Gracia C., 2006: synonym of Bathyglypta procera (Simone & Gracia, 2006) (original combination)

References

 Pelorce J. (2017). Les Columbellidae (Gastropoda: Neogastropoda) de la Guyane française. Xenophora Taxonomy. 14: 4-21

External links
 Radwin G.E. (1968). New taxa of western Atlantic Columbellidae (Gastropoda, Prosobranchia). Proceedings of the Biological Society of Washington. 81: 143-150.

Columbellidae